The 2016 Reinert Open was a professional tennis tournament played on outdoor clay courts. It was the ninth edition of the tournament and part of the 2016 ITF Women's Circuit, offering a total of $50,000 in prize money. It took place in Versmold, Germany, on 4–10 July 2016.

Singles main draw entrants

Seeds 

 1 Rankings as of 27 June 2016.

Other entrants 
The following player received a wildcard into the singles main draw:
  Sorana Cîrstea
  Katharina Gerlach
  Katharina Hobgarski
  Julia Wachaczyk

The following players received entry from the qualifying draw:
  Andrea Gámiz
  Yana Morderger
  Laura Schaeder
  Julia Terziyska

The following player received entry by a lucky loser spot:
  Anna Klasen

Champions

Singles

 Antonia Lottner def.  Tereza Smitková, 3–6, 7–5, 6–3

Doubles

 Natela Dzalamidze /  Valeriya Strakhova def.  Kanae Hisami /  Kotomi Takahata, 6–2, 6–1

External links 
 2016 Reinert Open at ITFtennis.com
 Official website 

2016 ITF Women's Circuit
Reinert Open
2016 in German tennis
2016 in German women's sport